Friskies PetCare Company was a division of Nestlé founded in 1985 that produced pet food. In 2001, it merged with Ralston Purina and became Nestlé Purina PetCare after Nestlé acquired all the outstanding shares of Ralston Purina.

Brands
Fancy Feast – gourmet cat food (introduced 1985)
Friskies – dry and wet cat food plus treats (introduced 1985)
 Mighty Dog – dog food (introduced 1985)
Alpo – dog food (introduced 1994)

References

Animal food manufacturers
Pet food brands
Ralston Purina
American companies established in 1985
Food and drink companies established in 1985
Food and drink companies disestablished in 2001